Mary Matilda Betham, known by family and friends as Matilda Betham (16 November 1776 – 30 September 1852), was an English diarist, poet, woman of letters, and miniature portrait painter. She exhibited at the Royal Academy of Arts from 1804 to 1816. Her first of four books of verses was published in 1797. For six years, she researched notable historical women around the world and published A Biographical Dictionary of the Celebrated Women of Every Age and Country in 1804.

Early life
Betham was the eldest of 14 children born to Rev. William Betham of Stonham Aspal, Suffolk and Mary Damant of Eye, Suffolk. Her father researched and published books on royal and English baronetage genealogy. He was also a schoolmaster and the Anglican rector of Stoke Lacy, Herefordshire.

Betham was baptised on 1 January 1777 and raised in Stonham Aspal. She is said to have had a happy childhood marred by poor health. She was largely self-educated in her father's library, but gleaned from it and his occasional tutelage an interest in history and literature. She claimed that a key loss of not having attending a school was that she did not learn the art of defending herself. From a young age, Betham would recite poetry and read of plays and history voraciously. She was sent out for sewing lessons "to prevent my too strict application to books." Betham learned to speak French during trips to London. Her younger brother was William Betham (1779–1853).

As the family grew, family furnishings were sold to support it, and although she was not pushed out of the home, Betham felt the need to support herself and taught herself to paint miniature portraits. It was during a trip to her Uncle Edward Beetham in London that she was inspired to pursue painting and explore her literary talents. The family lived in a centre of literary and artistic activity. While visiting the Beethams she met the artist John Opie, who was instructing her cousin, Jane Beetham, and received lessons from him during her stay. Betham was also encouraged to explore her literary talents by her uncle, who was a publisher. She studied with William Wordsworth and Italian with Agostino Isola in Cambridge in 1796.

Adulthood

In 1797, Betham wrote Elegies, and Other Small Poems, which included Italian poems translated into English and Arthur & Albina, a Druid ballad. She received a tribute for this from Samuel Taylor Coleridge, who wrote To Matilda from a Stranger in 1802, comparing her to Sappho and encouraging her to continue writing poetry.} Others who encouraged her were Lady Charlotte Bedingfield and her family.

Betham painted pleasant, delicate portraits, which she exhibited at the Royal Academy of Arts from 1804 to 1816 as a way to be financially independent from her parents who had many children to raise. Among the dozens of exhibited portraits were those of the Harriot Beauclerk, Duchess of St Albans, the poet George Dyer, Countess of Dysart, and Betham's father and other family members.

In 1804, she published A Biographical Dictionary of the Celebrated Women of Every Age and Country, the culmination of six years of research. It included short biographies of Mary Magdalene, Cleopatra, East Indian Bowanny, Madame Roland, and other notable historical women from around the world. Four years later she published her second book of poetry. Betham was also a close friend of Robert Southey and his wife, of Anna Laetitia Barbauld and her husband, and of Charles and his sister Mary. Other acquaintances in that period were Opie, Frances Holcroft, Hannah More, Germaine de Staël, and Samuel Taylor Coleridge. She made portraits of the Coleridges and the Southeys and wrote a verse for the marriage of Emma Isola, an adopted daughter of Lamb, to Edward Moxon.

Other works Betham published in magazines anonymously, while also giving public Shakespeare readings in London. Her best-received poem was Lay of Marie (1816), based upon the story of Marie de France, the medieval poet, written in couplets, included a scholarly appendix, as recommended by Southey, who said she was "likely to be the best poetess of her age."

However, Betham gave up her literary career and returned to the country after a series of aggravations, a breakdown of health, misfortunes, and family circumstances. For instance, advertisements to promote her book spelled her heroine's name Mario and misspelled her name, many printed books had become mildewed, and she was in financial distress as the result of the advertising and publication costs. She became destitute and tried to gain employment painting portraits, which was difficult because her clothing had become shabby.

By 17 June 1819, Betham had been put in a mental asylum by her family after she had suffered a mental breakdown, but she was acting and conversing normally again in 1820. Betham stated that she had suffered a "nervous fever" after the hard work and emotional stress of getting Lay of Marie published, and that she felt she was unjustly put into an institution without examination or treatment. Betham moved to London on her release and kept her address a secret. George Dyer successfully applied for assistance for her from the Royal Literary Fund, which had been established to aid authors in 1790 by David Williams.

Betham championed women's rights, called for greater participation of women in parliamentary affairs, and wrote Challenge to Women, Being an Intended Address from Ladies of Different Parts of the Kingdom, Collectively to Caroline, Queen of Great Britain and Ireland to address charges levelled against Queen Carolina during her acrimonious marriage to King George IV, calling for women to support her against state persecution and sign a petition on her behalf.

Betham was put into an asylum again in 1822 by her family. In the 1830s she lived with her parents in Islington. About 1836, Betham expressed sorrow at the death of several of her siblings in Sonnets and Verses, To Relations and their Connexions. A tale of two poisoned men was published in Dramatic Sketch in 1836. The manuscript for Hermoden, a play that she wrote in the late 1830s was lost and remains unpublished. She was reported to be studying at the British Museum in the 1830s.

In her later years Betham returned to London. and maintained her friendships, love of literature, wit, and her entertaining conversation and presence. However, it was hard for her to make a living. She was unable to obtain promised assistance in getting her manuscript for Crow-quill Flights printed. Betham had been rebuked when she asked friends for copies of poems that she had given them. Some of her manuscripts were accidentally burned at Stonham.

Betham died 30 September 1852 at 52 Burton Street in London, and was buried on the western side of Highgate Cemetery with her eldest sister, Theresa, who had died a year earlier. Some of her letters, along with a biographical sketch, appear in Six Life Stories of Famous Women (1880) by her niece, the novelist Matilda Betham-Edwards, but Betham-Edwards also burnt many of Betham's letters. Edwards published a biography of her in Friendly Faces of Three Nationalities.

Works

Literary

 - sometimes attributed to Matilda Betham

Paintings
She exhibited the following paintings at the Royal Academy of Arts between 1804 and 1816:

Miss Armstrong, by 1808
F. F. Baker, Esq., by 1805
Harriot Beauclerk, Duchess of St Albans, by 1804
Miss B. Betham, by 1811
Miss E Betham, by 1806
Mrs. J. Betham, by 1816
Miss M. Betham, by 1805
Mr. R. G. Betham, by 1810
Mrs. R. G. Betham, by 1816
Rev. William Betham, by 1810
Rev. William Betham, by 1812
Mr. Boughton, by 1806
Sir C. R. Boughton , by 1806
Miss R. Boughton, by 1807
Miss Rouse Boughton, by 1805
Miss Chesshyre, by 1806
Mr. Cromie, by 1805
Miss A. Dove, by 1816
Miss Duncan, by 1810
George Dyer, poet, by 1807
Countess of Dysart, by 1804
Rt. Hon. Lady Fauconberg, by 1806
Mr. Finucane, by 1805
Gaiety, miniature, by 1808
Rt. Hon. Lady E. Gamon, by 1807
Mrs. Colonel Gardner, by 1816
Miss M. Graham, by 1807
Mr. Manners, by 1804
Miss Manners, by 1804
Portrait of a lady, by 1807
Portrait of a lady, by 1808
Portrait of Mr. de Venville, Mr. Southey the poet, and Messrs. C. and G. Betham, by 1808
Mrs. Pymar, by 1812
Mr. Saxon, by 1807
Self portrait, by 1810
Rev. P. Stockdale, by 1811
Mrs. C. Thompson, by 1807
Master F. Thompson, by 1807
Lady Wilson, by 1806

The Dinner Party
In 1804, the male sculptor Kresilas was mistakenly identified as a woman named Cresilla by Betham, who thought "she" had been placed third behind Polykleitos and Phidias in a competition to sculpt seven Amazons for the Temple of Artemis at Ephesus. So Kresilas was mistakenly included in artist Judy Chicago's symbolic history of women in Western civilization, The Dinner Party.

See also
Isabella Beetham, her sister-in-law, a silhouette artist
Jane Beetham Read, her cousin, a miniature and silhouette portrait painter
William Betham (1779–1853), her brother, an English herald and antiquarian

Notes

References

Further reading

External links

(Mary) Matilda Betham at the Eighteenth-Century Poetry Archive (ECPA)

1776 births
1852 deaths
Burials at Highgate Cemetery
English women poets
People from Stradbroke
English women painters
Portrait miniaturists
18th-century English poets
18th-century English women writers
18th-century English writers
19th-century English painters
19th-century English poets
19th-century English women writers
English biographers
Women biographers
19th-century biographers
English women non-fiction writers
19th-century British women artists